Thorius schmidti, commonly known as Schmidt's pigmy salamander, is a species of salamander in the family Plethodontidae. It is endemic to Mexico and only known from near the village of Zoquitlán in the Sierra Madre de Oaxaca of southern Puebla, possibly also from Oaxaca. It is named after Karl Patterson Schmidt, American herpetologist.

It is an uncommon leaf-litter species inhabiting dense pine-oak forest at elevations of  asl. It is threatened by habitat loss caused by logging and expanding agriculture and human settlements.

References

schmidti
Endemic amphibians of Mexico
Fauna of the Sierra Madre de Oaxaca
Taxonomy articles created by Polbot
Amphibians described in 1959